Dominy is a surname. Notable people with the surname include:

Arthur Dominy (1893–1974), English footballer and manager
Floyd Dominy (1909–2010), Nebraska born Bureau of Reclamation Commissioner
John Dominy (1816–1891), British horticulturist and plant hybridiser